Tsamakaberd, is a residential neighborhood in the town of Sevan of Gegharkunik Province, Armenia. It is located to the north east of the town centre. It is home to a cyclopean fortress, and the historic district of Mashtotsner.

See also 
Gegharkunik Province

References 

Populated places in Gegharkunik Province